The ring-tentacle anemone (Isanthus capensis) is a species of sea anemone in the family Isanthidae.

Description
The ring-tentacle anemone grows up to 1 cm in diameter. It is a small solitary anemone with numerous short striped tentacles and having stripes radiating out from its mouth. It is usually brown or greenish and its body column is smooth.

Distribution
It has so far been found only on the Atlantic coast of the Cape Peninsula of South Africa. It appears to be endemic to this area, and lives from the intertidal zone down to about 5m under water.

Ecology
This anemone is found between rocks and on seaweeds. It feeds on plankton.

References

Animals described in 1938
Isanthidae